This is a list of National Premier Leagues NSW honours achieved since the inaugural season of the league in 2013. The following details honours won by National Premier Leagues NPL Men clubs and those awarded to players, managers and referees of the competition.

Club honours

Premiers

Champions

Club Championship 
The Club Championship goes to the team with highest points from first grade and U-20's competitions (with points modifiers). In previous editions it has included the U-18's premiership also and used as a tool for promotion/relegation. Currently, the Club Championship is calculated from first grade premiership points x4 and under 20's premiership points x2 and promotion/relegation is determined by first grade premiership standings.

Fair Play Award 
The Fair Play Award goes to the team with the fewest points on the fair play ladder at the conclusion of the regular season. The award was first presented in 2017.

Individual honours

Player of the Year

Robbie Slater Award 
The Robbie Slater Award is given to the player of the match in the Grand Final.

Golden Boot

Coach of the Year

Goalkeeper of the Year

Goal of the Year

Referee of the Year

References

External links
New South Wales Premier League
Oz Football NSW Statistics
Weltfussballarchiv

New South Wales Premier League
1
National Premier Leagues
Second level football leagues in Asia